Kalniņš (Old orthography: Kalnin(g); feminine: Kalniņa) is a native Latvian-language topographic surname, derived from the Latvian word for "hill" (kalns).  May also be Russified as Kalnin (Калнин, Калнынь). Notable people with the surname include:

Alfrēds Kalniņš, Latvian composer
Brūno Kalniņš, Latvian social democratic politician and historian
Eduards Kalniņš, Latvian general.
Gatis Kalniņš, Latvian striker
, German-Latvian bishop
Imants Kalniņš, Latvian composer
Ivars Kalniņš, Latvian film and television actor
Jānis Kalniņš, Canadian composer, son of Alfreds
Jānis Kalniņš, Latvian ice hockey goaltender
Klāra Kalniņa  (1874–1964),  Latvian feminist, suffragette, editor, and politician
Leonīds Kalniņš (born 1957), Latvian politician and general
Ojārs Ēriks Kalniņš (1949–2021), Latvian politician and diplomat 
Pauls Kalniņš, Latvian social democratic politician and four-time acting president
Pēteris Kalniņš, Latvian luger
Rodrigo Kalniņš, Latvian actor
Rolands Kalniņš, Latvian film director
Rēzija Kalniņa, Latvian actress
Zanda Kalniņa-Lukaševica, Latvian politician

Latvian toponymic surnames
Latvian-language masculine surnames